Aranella fimbriata is a taxonomic synonym that may refer to:

Utricularia longeciliata syn. [Aranella fimbriata Gleason]
Utricularia fimbriata syn. Aranella fimbriata (Kunth) Barnhart
Utricularia simulans syn. [Aranella fimbriata Barnhart]

Utricularia by synonymy